Ratha Kalpana is a metaphor used in Hindu scriptures to describe the relationship between the senses, mind, intellect and the Self. The metaphor was first used in the Katha Upanishad and is thought to have inspired similar descriptions in the Bhagavad Gita, the Dhammapada and Plato's Phaedrus. Gerald James Larson, a scholar of Indian philosophies, believes that the chariot metaphor contains one of the earliest references to ideas and terminology of the Indian philosophical school Samkhya.

Background

The chariot analogy first appears the third chapter of Katha Upanishad, as a device to explain the Atman (Self) as distinct from the mind, intelligence and sense organs. In this context, spiritual practice is seen as a return to consciousness through the levels of manifested existence. The metaphor forms a part of the teaching imparted to Nachiketa, a child seeking knowledge about life after death, by Yama, the Hindu god of death.

William K. Mahony, in The Artful Universe: An Introduction to the Vedic Religious Imagination, writes, "We have in this metaphor an image of a powerful process that can either lead to fulfillment or in which the seeker can become lost."

Analogy
Verses 1.3.3–11 of Katha Upanishad deal with the allegoric expression of human body as a chariot. The body is equated to a chariot where the horses are the senses, the mind is the reins, and the driver or charioteer is the intellect. The passenger of the chariot is the Self (Atman). Through this analogy, it is explained that the Atman is separate from the physical body, just as the passenger of a chariot is separate from the chariot. The verses conclude by describing control of the chariot and contemplation on the Self as ways by which the intellect acquires Self Knowledge.

Shankaracharya Commentary:

See also
 Chariot Allegory
 Kosha
 Vajira

References

Notes

Citations

Bibliography

Hindu philosophical concepts
Metaphors referring to objects